Senff is a German surname.

People with the surname include:
 Bartholf Senff (1815–1900), German music publisher
 Birgit Senff, retired German gymnast
 Karl August Senff (1770–1838), Baltic German painter
 Nida Senff (1920–1995), Dutch swimmer
 Theresa Senff (b. 1982), German road cyclist
 Senff (b. 1971), Dutch/Canadian musician and actor

German-language surnames